Ramon Magsaysay High School (RMHS) is a high school in Manila, Philippines. It was founded as the Governor Forbes annex of V. Mapa High School in 1952. In 1959, it was renamed Ramon Magsaysay High School, in honor of former Philippine president Ramon Magsaysay.

History

Nine principals in turn have led the school:
 Maria M. Ocampo (1959–1972)
 William L. Estrada (1972–1976)
 Mateo A. Angeles (1976–1987)
 Esperanza B. Bautista (1987–1995)
 Elena R. Ruiz (1996–1997)
 Leon R. San Miguel (1997–1999)
 Cristina C. Reyes (1999–2010)
 Alma C. Tadina (2010–2017)
 Gene T. Pangilinan (2017–present)

Education in Sampaloc, Manila
High schools in Manila
Public schools in Metro Manila